The Ganzhou–Shaoguan railway is a single-track electrified railway connecting Jiangxi and Guangdong Province in southeastern China. Construction began in August 2009 and the line entered operation on September 30, 2014. Major cities and towns along route include Ganzhou, Nankang, and Dayu County in Jiangxi and Nanxiong, Shixing and Shaoguan in Guangdong.

The line connects the Beijing–Guangzhou and Beijing–Kowloon railways and has reduced travel time by rail from Guangzhou to Nanchang by three hours.

Rail connections
 Ganzhou: Beijing–Kowloon railway, Ganzhou–Longyan railway
 Shaoguan: Beijing–Guangzhou railway, Beijing–Guangzhou–Shenzhen–Hong Kong high-speed railway

See also

 List of railways in China

References

Railway lines in China
Rail transport in Jiangxi
Rail transport in Guangdong
Railway lines opened in 2014